Wallace William "Wally" Diestelmeyer (July 14, 1926 – December 23, 1999) was a Canadian figure skater. He competed in pair skating with Suzanne Morrow.  The couple won the bronze medal at the 1948 Winter Olympics and the 1948 World Figure Skating Championships.  They are credited as being the first pair to perform the death spiral one-handed, with the man holding the woman in position with one hand, at the 1948 Olympic Games.

After retiring from competitions Distelmeyer worked as a skating coach. In 1992 he was inducted into the Skate Canada Hall of Fame, together with Morrow.

Results

Men's singles

Pairs with Suzanne Morrow

with Joyce Perkins

with Floraine Ducharme

Ice dance with Suzanne Morrow

References

External links

 Profile

1926 births
1999 deaths
Canadian male single skaters
Canadian male pair skaters
Canadian people of German descent
Figure skaters at the 1948 Winter Olympics
Olympic bronze medalists for Canada
Olympic figure skaters of Canada
Sportspeople from Kitchener, Ontario
Skating people from Ontario
Olympic medalists in figure skating
World Figure Skating Championships medalists
Medalists at the 1948 Winter Olympics
Canadian figure skating coaches
20th-century Canadian people